The BOK-2 (Byuro Osobykh Konstrooktsiy - bureau of special design)  (a.k.a. RK Razreznoye Krylo – slotted wing) was an aerodynamic research aircraft designed by S. S. Krichyevskii and built in the USSR in 1934.

Development
The BOK-2 was a research aircraft fitted with a slotted wing, which comprised the main forward part and the large variable incidence rear section with a slot between them. This small wooden single seater powered by an M-11 engine was flown successfully in 1935 but was abandoned, whilst in the process of being modified to allow the aerofoil, and slotted section, to automatically adopt the most efficient profile, when S. S. Krichyevskii died suddenly late in 1935.

See also
 List of  aircraft

Notes

References

 Gunston, Bill. “The Osprey Encyclopaedia of Russian Aircraft 1875 – 1995”. London, Osprey. 1995. 
 Taylor, Michael J.H. . “ Jane's Encyclopedia of Aviation. Studio Editions. London. 1989.  

1930s Soviet experimental aircraft
BOK aircraft
Mid-wing aircraft
Single-engined tractor aircraft
Tandem-wing aircraft
Aircraft first flown in 1935